The Silver Dollar Group was an offshoot of the Ku Klux Klan white nationalist terrorist group, composed of leaderless resistance cells that took up violent actions to support Klan goals. The group was largely found in Mississippi and Louisiana, and was named for their practice of identifying themselves by carrying a silver dollar. The group is believed to have had only some twenty members. The group formed in 1964 at the Shamrock Motor Hotel in Vidalia, Louisiana by Raleigh Jackson "Red" Glover, amidst dissatisfaction at the lack of forceful action by Klan groups in the region.

The group killed an African American man, Frank Morris, by arson in Ferriday, Louisiana for alleged flirting with white women, and is suspected in two car bombings of NAACP leaders in Natchez, Mississippi, George Metcalfe and Wharlest Jackson. Morris had a shoe repair shop in Ferriday, and died after his shoe repair shop was burned. The group is also suspected in the disappearance and murder of an African American employee of the Shamrock Motel, Joseph Edwards. Some members of local law enforcement, including Concordia Parish Sheriff Department deputy Frank DeLaughter, were members of the Silver Dollar Group.

2007 Prosecution
In 2007, Silver Dollar Group member James Ford Seale was charged and convicted for the May 1964 kidnapping of Henry Hezekiah Dee and Charles Eddie Moore, two African-American young men in Meadville, Mississippi.

References

1964 establishments in Louisiana
Gangs in Mississippi
Ku Klux Klan organizations
Concordia Parish, Louisiana
Adams County, Mississippi
Lynching in the United States
Racially motivated violence against African Americans
Gangs in Louisiana